Mezhdugranka is a rural locality (a selo) in Vasilyevsky Selsoviet of Belogorsky District, Amur Oblast, Russia. The population was 345 as of 2018. There are 8 streets.

Geography 
Mezhdugranka is located near the left bank of the Tom River, 9 km southeast of Belogorsk (the district's administrative centre) by road. Vasilyevka is the nearest rural locality.

References 

Rural localities in Belogorsky District